Spy Kids: Mission Critical is a Canadian-American computer-animated adventure-comedy streaming television series based on the Spy Kids franchise. Its first season was released on Netflix on April 20, 2018. Before the series was released, it was renewed for a second season, which was released on November 30 the same year.

Plot 
In Mission Critical, brother-and-sister team Juni and Carmen Cortez attend Spy Kids Academy, a top secret spy school for kid agents. When a new counter-spy agency threatens the safety of the world, it will be up to junior spies Juni and Carmen to train and lead a team of fellow Spy Kids cadets against the forces of S.W.A.M.P. (Sinister Wrongdoers Against Mankind's Preservation) and their diabolical leader, Golden Brain. The Mission Critical team may not be ready, but they are the only ones to call when grown-up spies can't do the job.

Voice cast and characters 
 Ashley Bornancin as Carmen Cortez/Tango, and Barracuda.
 Carter Hastings as Juni Cortez/Aztec.
 Caitlyn Bairstow as Glitch and Gablet
 Nicholas Coombe as Ace.
 Nesta Cooper as Claudia Floop/Scorpion.
 Richard Ian Cox as Sir Awesome.
 Tom Kenny as Golden Brain, Spurious Visage, Professor Küpkakke, and Dave-Bot.
 Travis Turner as Peter St. Ignatius/PSI/Agent No-One.
 Christian Lanz as Gregorio Cortez, Fegan Floop, DJ Otto Tune/Death Meddle.
 Candi Milo as Vida Immortata, Malware, Mauly the Sparkle Scout, Kopi Vasquez, and Glendora Chatting-Botham. 
 Mira Sorvino as Ingrid Avellan-Cortez.
 Yuri Lowenthal as Desmond "Dez" and Zedmond "Zed" Vasquez/Rock n' Roll, Jaime Vasquez, Talon, and Jason Pietranthony/Improv/Improvisario.
 Molly Shannon as Murna.
 Kate Micucci as Therese.
 Patton Oswalt as Bradley Feinstein/Mint Condition.
 Bobcat Goldthwait as JT/The Worm.
 Thomas Lennon as Dr. Chad Jericho.
 Terrence Stone as the deeply-distorted voice of Agent No-One (season 1).
 Robert Englund as Agent No-One's disguised voice (season 2, episode 8).

Production 
Spy Kids: Mission Critical was produced by The Weinstein Company and Netflix and was scheduled for release in 2018. The first and second seasons each consist of 10 episodes and was produced by Mainframe Studios.

The series was announced by Mike Fleming, Jr. with Michael Hefferon and Sean Jara as show's creators. The show's villains were described to be "colorful" as the protagonists. The series was said to contain "as much comedy as wish fulfillment". FM DeMarco is the head writer of the series. WOW! Unlimited Media Inc.'s Vancouver-based Mainframe Studios, the TV division of Rainmaker Entertainment, partnered with the Weinstein Company to produce the series, with the series having a multi-season commitment. John Tellegen was one of the show's writers. Robert Rodriguez and Bob Weinstein were executive producers due to Harvey Weinstein firing, making it the first Weinstein Company title not to have Harvey's involvement.

Ashley Bornancin, Carter Hastings, Travis Turner, Mira Sorvino, Tom Kenny and Christian Lanz voiced Carmen, Juni, PSI, Ingrid, Golden Brain and Gregorio respectively. FM De Marco said that he had "many inspirations for the series but it has its own very specific style and attitude". He also said that the show has a nice mix of all kinds of humor, and contains old and new characters. Travis Turner faced controversy for being cast as the voice of PSI, a black character, since Travis himself is white. On April 18, 2 days before the show's launch, the Weinstein Company was removed as distributor. Dimension Television, a division of Dimension Films, took over production for the first 2 seasons and is credited. Bob Weinstein's name was also removed from the show, but he was credited in 4 episodes.

Episodes

Season 1 (2018)

Season 2 (2018)

References

External links
 Official website at Netflix
 

2018 American television series debuts
2018 American television series endings
2018 Canadian television series debuts
2018 Canadian television series endings
2010s American animated television series
2010s Canadian animated television series
2010s Canadian comic science fiction television series
American children's animated action television series
American children's animated adventure television series
American children's animated comedy television series
American computer-animated television series
Animated television series about children
Animated television series about siblings
Animated television shows based on films
Anime-influenced Western animated television series
Canadian children's animated action television series
Canadian children's animated adventure television series
Canadian children's animated comedy television series
Canadian computer-animated television series
Hispanic and Latino American television
Netflix children's programming
English-language Netflix original programming
Television series by Rainmaker Studios
Television series by The Weinstein Company
Television shows filmed in Vancouver
Espionage television series
Mission Critical